is a video game created by Capcom for the Xbox console where the player controls a "Vertical Tank"—a bipedal, heavily armed mecha. To control the tank and play the game requires the use of a large controller (Mega-Jockey-9000) made specially for Steel Battalion. The controller consists of 44 input points—mainly buttons—but also uses 2 joysticks, a throttle handle, a radio channel dial, 5 switches, an eject button, and 3 foot pedals. Only limited quantities were made available. These quickly sold out, making the game a collector's piece. It has since been re-released in limited quantities worldwide, with blue controller buttons distinguishing it from the first edition with green buttons.

Gameplay
At the beginning of every mission, the player must 'start up' the machine and operating system; this is handled through a series of switches and buttons dedicated to this purpose. If a corner is turned too fast, the machine will tumble over. If the player's machine overheats, its operating system must be reset. The game even simulates window wipers in case of mud hitting the monitor. If the player does not eject when prompted, the player's in-game character will "die", and the game will delete its own saved data, prompting the player to start over from the beginning.

Vertical tanks (VTs) are the vehicles piloted in the series.  Essentially bipedal walking weapons platforms, VTs are classed by their developmental generation and sub-categorised by their combat role.  Primary combat roles are standard combat, assault, support, scout, and fast attack. Vertical tanks are divided into three weight classes: light, medium and heavy. As the player progresses, new generations of VTs become available. This allows a newer, more advanced operating system, startup sequence, and combat functions, as well as a wider cockpit view and layout. New generation VTs also handle better and can provide better firepower over previous generations.

Development

Steel Battalion was developed by Capcom Production Studio 4 in collaboration with former Human Entertainment designers that would go on to form Nude Maker. Producer Atsushi Inaba stated at the Game Developers Conference in 2005 that the Steel Battalion was a "product-focused project" in which the team initially focused on creating a new peripheral and software designed to go with it. Inaba's superiors were skeptical about putting such a game on the market. The number of staff working on the project grew according to the team's experience with making new hardware. The earliest build of the game was created for the PlayStation 2. However, when the Xbox became available, the development team switched to it because of the system's greater power. Online play was taken out of consideration close to the development's start due to being too ambitious. While the game and its special controller received critical acclaim, the project turned little profit. Inaba said that Steel Battalion was developed to show "what can be done in the game industry that cannot be done in others".

Reception

The game received "favorable" reviews according to the review aggregation website Metacritic. In Japan, Famitsu gave it a score of 35 out of 40. It was nominated for GameSpots 2002 "Best Graphics (Artistic)" and "Best Game No One Played" awards among Xbox games, but also the publication's "Most Disappointing Game on Xbox" prize. 

Steel Battalion was the fifth best-selling game during its week of release in Japan at about 15,092 copies. Inaba concluded that the game ultimately broke even in terms of units shipped and units sold.

A reviewer on IGN wrote "where MechAssault and Robotech wouldn't let us into the cockpit, Steel Battalion won't let us out" and joked the US$200 cost was for the controller while the game disc was free.

Sequels
A sequel called Steel Battalion: Line of Contact was released in 2004, and also used the game's unique controller. The third installment called Steel Battalion: Heavy Armor was released in June 2012. This installment uses the Kinect motion sensor control rather than the original controller.

Notes

References

External links
  (no longer active)
 

 
2002 video games
Capcom franchises
Capcom games
Microsoft games
Military science fiction video games
Nude Maker games
Video games about mecha
Video games developed in Japan
Xbox games
Xbox-only games